This is a list of comics publications released by AC Comics (formerly known as "Paragon Publications" and "Americomics").

List

AC Comics